Kuiterichthys is a genus of frogfishes endemic to the coastal waters of Australia. They are small fish that can reach  in standard length.

Species
There are currently two recognized species in this genus:
 Kuiterichthys furcipilis (G. Cuvier), 1817 (Rough anglerfish)
 Kuiterichthys pietschi R. J. Arnold, 2013

There are also specimens that do not conform to the diagnosis of either of the two recognized species. These might represent a third, undescribed species.

References

Antennariidae
Marine fish genera
Ray-finned fish genera
Endemic fauna of Australia
Taxa named by Theodore Wells Pietsch III